Sony Music Special Products is record label of Sony Music Custom Marketing Group. It is headed by Richard Chechilo. Its primary products are premium and special offer CDs, digital downloads and ringtones.

See also
 List of record labels

External links
 Official homepage

American record labels
Sony Music